6800K may refer to:
AMD A10-6800K, CPU released in 2013
Intel Core i7-6800K, CPU released in 2016